Runabout is a series of destruction-themed driving games developed by Climax Entertainment. Games in this series have been released on PlayStation, PlayStation 2, Dreamcast and Nintendo 3DS. Runabout's main missions consist of the player driving from point A to point B in order to pick up or deliver an item. The first game had more than one map to choose from, whereas the later ones utilized one city map modeled after an actual location—San Francisco in Super Runabout (Dreamcast) and New York in Runabout 3 Neo Age (PlayStation 2).
Players start off with just a few vehicles. When players complete a mission, destroy as much as they can, or drive without damaging anything, they are rewarded with a new vehicle. In the newer games, players are also rewarded with paint jobs and special abilities for each individual vehicle.

Although made in Japan, all games in the series feature mostly English text and dialogue regardless of the region. Vehicles across all games include a pickup truck, NSR (Honda NSX), F1 car, tank, and various novelty vehicles such as the RCC (radio-controlled car).

Titles

Felony 11–79 (Runabout)

Runabout 2

List of Runabout 2 vehicles

Super Runabout: San Francisco Edition (The Golden State)

Runabout 3: Neo Age

Released only in Japan and Europe, this third follow-up for the PlayStation 2 offers just one city, the city of New York.
The graphics were improved over those of the previous game. Alterations included improved reflections and character animations, and generally higher polygon counts on the game's vehicle, as well as character and object models. The game featured sections where the player was required to drift crash to get "Drift Crash Points." There were also vehicle-jumping distance and speed records.

Extras
The Options menu featured two unlockable sections, one of which was an "Object List" in which every crashable object in the game was displayed. The names were written in colors to reflect their scarcity (items marked with gold being common, and those marked with green being special mission objects).
Also in the options menu was the "Bonus Tip" list, where one could keep track of what bonuses were received as well as the criteria for obtaining bonuses not yet revealed. The bonuses ranged from unlockable vehicles to extra paint jobs or special actions for the vehicles.

Reception
On release, Famitsu magazine scored the game a 31 out of 40.

Runabout 3D: Drive Impossible
The first 3D game in the series was released for the Nintendo 3DS in Japan on January 19, 2012. It was developed by Rocket Company. The game was released as Crash City Mayhem in Europe by British video game publisher, Ghostlight and in North America by American video game publisher, Majesco Entertainment.

Music in Runabout

Felony 11–79 (or Runabout in Japan), Super Runabout and Runabout 3 Neo Age all feature soundtracks performed by Japanese surf band Surf Coasters, who are known for their Dick Dale-esque sound.

References

1997 video games
Dreamcast games
PlayStation (console) games
PlayStation (console)-only games
PlayStation 2 games
PlayStation 2-only games
Racing video games
Video game franchises
Video games developed in Japan
Yanoman games